Maurice Lowe (born in Bermuda) is a Bermudan football manager.

References

External links
 

Living people
Bermudian footballers
Bermuda international footballers
Association football defenders
Bermudian football managers
Year of birth missing (living people)